The 1949 National Challenge Cup was the largest soccer tournament in the United States in 1949. The four St. Louis Soccer League teams withdrew from the competition citing "a succession of unpleasant experiences connected with the playing of the National Challenge Cup." The St.L league teams were upset about financial losses totaling $2300 from the previous season's tournament. The announcement of the withdrawal came a week and a half after Brookhattan-Galicia stuck Simpkins with a $1550 airline bill following the 1948 championship game hosted by the Simpkins. The remaining St. Louis representatives were the four amateur Municipal League entrants. With the defending champions out of the running Morgan Strasser stepped in as contenders by winning their way to the final four. Despite losing the first legs in both the semifinal and final the Morgans pulled out 4-3 aggregate wins to become 1949 U.S. champions.

Eastern Division

Western Division

Final

See also
1949 National Amateur Cup

External links
1949 US Open Cup results from TheCup.us
Soccer in American (1949)

References

U.S. Open Cup
U.S.